Alexandra Pauline "Sasha" Cohen (born October 26, 1984) is a retired American figure skater. She is the 2006 Olympic silver medalist, a three-time World Championship medalist, the 2003 Grand Prix Final Champion, and the 2006 U.S. Champion. She is known for her artistry, flexibility and body lines, and musical interpretation. , Cohen is the most recent American woman to medal individually in figure skating at the Olympics.

Early life 
Cohen was born in Westwood, California, a neighborhood in Los Angeles. Her nickname "Sasha" is a Russian diminutive of "Alexandra". Her mother, Galina Cohen (née Feldman), is a Jewish immigrant from Odessa, Ukrainian SSR, Soviet Union and a former ballet dancer. Her father, Roger Cohen, is a graduate of the University of California, Berkeley Boalt Hall School of Law and formerly a law partner at Brobeck, Phleger & Harrison. Cohen has a younger sister, Natalia (nicknamed "Natasha"), who began college at Barnard College in August 2006. She understands and can speak Russian, but refuses to speak it in public.

Cohen graduated from Futures High School in Mission Viejo, California in 2002. Cohen graduated from Columbia University in 2016 with a degree in political science. As a university student, she has used the name Alex rather than Sasha.

In 2005, Cohen published her autobiography, Fire on Ice. The autobiography was republished in 2006 adding a new chapter on the 2006 season.

Skating career

Early career
A gymnast from an early age, Cohen switched to figure skating when she was seven years old, but it wasn't until she was eleven that she began to take the sport seriously. One of her early skating coaches was Victor Yelchin, father of late actor Anton Yelchin.

Cohen rose to prominence in the skating community during the 2000 U.S. Championships. Just up from juniors, Cohen was first in the short program and finished second overall after the free skate, provisionally qualifying for the senior World team. A loophole in the ISU's age rules at the time would have allowed her to compete at the senior World Championships if she medaled at the World Junior Championships but she finished 6th at the junior event.

Senior development and success
Cohen did not compete at the 2001 U.S. Nationals due to a stress fracture in her back. She resumed full training in June 2001. Cohen won the silver medal at the 2002 U.S. championships, earning her a trip to the Olympics. Cohen competed at the 2002 Winter Olympics in Salt Lake City, Utah, finishing 4th. She also finished 4th at the 2002 World Championships, held in Nagano. Cohen was coached by John Nicks in California.

In the summer of 2002, Cohen moved to the East Coast to train with Tatiana Tarasova at the International Skating Center of Connecticut in Simsbury, Connecticut. She won her first ISU Grand Prix event at the 2002 Skate Canada and then won the 2002 Trophée Lalique. She won the silver medal at the 2002 Cup of Russia. These three placements earned her a spot to the 2002–03 Grand Prix Final, where she became the champion. At the 2003 U.S. championships she won the bronze medal, and at the 2003 World Championships, held in Washington, D.C., Cohen placed 4th, repeating her placement in the previous season.

Her best season was 2003–04, when she took gold at the 2003 Skate America, at the 2003 Skate Canada (setting a world record in the short program) and at the 2003 Trophée Lalique and won silver at the 2003–04 Grand Prix Final. In late December 2003, she changed coaches and began training with Robin Wagner in Hackensack, New Jersey. She placed second at both the 2004 U.S. Championships and the 2004 World Championships, getting a medal at Worlds for the first time in her career.

In the 2004–05 season, Cohen withdrew from her Grand Prix events due to a recurring back injury. In late December 2004, Cohen decided to return to California and train again with her first coach John Nicks. She placed 2nd at the 2005 U.S. championships in Portland and the 2005 World Championships in Moscow, Russia.

2006 Olympic season
Cohen started her Olympic season by placing first at the Campbell's International Figure Skating Challenge. Soon after she withdrew from Skate America due to a hip injury. She took second place at Trophée Eric Bompard, where she fell on a triple salchow during her free skate. In 2006, Cohen overcame the flu to capture her first U.S. championship. With this victory Cohen automatically secured her place on the U.S. Olympic team for the 2006 Winter Olympics, a spot made official on January 14 of that year by the United States Figure Skating Association.

At the 2006 Winter Olympics in Turin, Cohen was in first after the short program, leading Russia's Irina Slutskaya by a mere .03 points. In the final free skate, Cohen fell on her first jump, a triple lutz, and had her hands down on her second jump, the triple flip. She completed the rest of her elements, including five triples. Cohen finished with an Olympic silver medal, 7.98 points behind gold medalist Shizuka Arakawa of Japan.

A month later at the 2006 World Championships in Calgary, Canada, Cohen was in first place after the short program. Completing only one jump combination and falling on the triple salchow, she placed fourth in the free skate and won the bronze medal, finishing almost ten points behind her teammate, gold medalist Kimmie Meissner.

Post 2006 Olympics

In April 2006, Cohen started the Champions on Ice tour, participated in the second annual "Skating with the Stars, Under the Stars" gala in Central Park and performed in the Marshalls U.S. Figure Skating International Showcase. On April 15, 2006, Cohen announced that she intended to compete in the 2010 season and the 2010 Winter Olympics in Vancouver. She said via her official website, "I will decide after the COI Tour how much skating and what events I will do next season."

In December 2006, Cohen announced that she needed "a little downtime from competing" and that she would not defend her U.S. Figure Skating Championship title in 2007. She said that her "major goals" were the 2009 World Championships and the 2010 Olympics; "I know I want to be in Vancouver for the 2010 Olympics."

Cohen did not compete in 2007, 2008, or 2009, although she did not give up her Olympic eligibility. She performed in exhibitions, including the Rockefeller Christmas Tree lighting and USFSA-approved events. She was a headliner in the 2007–08 and 2008–09 Stars on Ice tour.

Return to competition
Cohen announced on May 6, 2009 that she planned to make a comeback for the 2010 Winter Olympics. She said she would train with Rafael Arutyunyan. Cohen received invitations to compete in the 2009 Trophée Eric Bompard and in the 2009 Skate America in the 2009–10 Grand Prix series but withdrew from both due to tendinitis in her right calf. In November 2009, she changed coaches to John Nicks, who worked closer to where she lived.

On January 21, 2010, Cohen competed for the first time in four years at the 2010 U.S. Championships in Spokane, Washington. She debuted her program to España cañí, and skated a strong performance landing a triple lutz-double toe, a triple flip, a double Axel, along with her signature spiral sequence and spins earning 69.63 points putting her in second place, just 0.43 from first-place finisher Mirai Nagasu. However, in her free skate, set to Moonlight Sonata, she fell on a triple flip and had two-footed landings on a number of other jumps. Cohen finished fourth in the championships, behind Rachael Flatt, Mirai Nagasu and Ashley Wagner, and was not selected for the Olympic team; however, was appointed as second alternate to the 2010 U.S. Olympic team and the 2010 World Championship team. She retired from figure skating in 2010.

Post-2010
In 2015, Cohen was inducted into the Southern California Jewish Sports Hall of Fame. On December 15, 2015, U.S. Figure Skating announced Cohen would be a member of the U.S. Figure Skating Hall of Fame Class of 2016. The induction ceremony was held on January 22, 2016 at the 2016 U.S. Figure Skating Championships.

Skating trademarks

Cohen is the first skater to receive +3s for spirals under the International Skating Union Judging System (IJS) for "Grade of Execution (GOE)", and was also the first female to break the +130 barrier on a free skate under the IJS. At the beginning of her senior career she was labeled as one in the generation of "Baby Ballerinas" (alongside Naomi Nari Nam) due to her body lines and the ability to point her toes during difficult skating maneuvers such as triple jumps, spiral sequences and footwork. She is known for her 180º arabesque penchée spiral and Charlotte spiral, as well as the variety of positions in her spins. She popularized the I-spin position, which is sometimes informally referred to as the "Sasha spin", due to her exceptional execution of the move.

Ice shows
Cohen has participated in the ice show Stars On Ice for several years, as well as starring in the 2010 Art On Ice alongside Stéphane Lambiel. She joined 2010 Olympic ladies champion Yuna Kim in the All That Skate ice show, scheduled for July 23–25, 2010 in Goyang, South Korea, alongside other skaters including Michelle Kwan, Stéphane Lambiel and Brian Joubert.

Television and film
Cohen has appeared, as herself and as an actress playing a role, in commercials, television episodes, documentaries and feature films.

Television
Cohen has done commercials for Citizen Watch, Simply Saline, and Got Milk?. She appeared in Episode 7 of the second season of Project Runway wherein designers were challenged to design a skating dress for her. The winning dress (by Zulema Griffin) did not fit and the dress had to be resized. Cohen made a brief appearance guest starring as herself on the May 5, 2006 episode of the NBC drama, Las Vegas. In April 2008, she appeared as a contortionist on the premiere episode of Secret Talents of the Stars and advanced to the semifinals, although the show was cancelled before she could perform again. She made a guest appearance as an ice skater in CSI: NY season 3 episode 12 "Silent Night". Cohen also participated in the 2013 edition of "Tornado Week" on The Weather Channel, helping break the myth that small tornadoes are not as destructive by demonstrating a tight spin.

Film
Cohen played Fiona Hughes, Moondance Alexander's archenemy, in the Don Johnson movie Moondance Alexander. At the 2006 Academy Awards, Cohen served as a guest correspondent for Inside Edition. This experience led to an encounter with Ben Stiller and a discussion about having a part in a future comedy about figure skating, which Cohen said she would enjoy. In 2007, she appeared as herself in Blades of Glory. Later that year, she also had a role in Bratz: The Movie. In 2017, Cohen appeared as herself in the SyFy tv movie, Sharknado 5.

Cohen was featured in The Weight of Gold (2020), an HBO Sports Documentary which "explor(es) the mental health challenges that Olympic athletes often face."

Personal life
On July 5, 2015, it was announced that Cohen was engaged to hedge fund manager Tom May. On August 20, 2016, the couple married in Cape Cod, Massachusetts. In February 2018, she and May were living apart and going through divorce proceedings. Cohen now works as an associate at Morgan Stanley. In October 2019, Cohen announced her engagement to Geoffrey Lieberthal, an equity partner who is also the son of political scientist Kenneth Lieberthal. They have two children: a son born in January 2020 and a daughter born in August 2021. Cohen and Lieberthal married in September 2022 in Aspen Mountain, Colorado.

Programs

Competitive highlights
GP = Grand Prix; JGP = Junior Grand Prix

Detailed results

Post 2001

2001 and earlier
 2001: Goodwill Games – 4th; Finlandia Trophy – 1st
 2000: U.S. Championships – 2nd; World Junior Championships – 6th; Nations Cup – 5th; Cup of Russia – 4th
 1999: U.S. Championships, Junior – 2nd

See also
List of select Jewish figure skaters

Further reading
Cohen, Sasha. (2006). Fire on Ice (Revised Edition): Autobiography of a Champion Figure Skater. Collins.

References

External links

 
 
 
 
 
 
 
 
 

Winter Olympics scores
2006 Winter Olympics
2002 Winter Olympics
World Championships scores
2006 Worlds
2005 Worlds
2004 Worlds
2003 Worlds
2002 Worlds

ISU Grand Prix Finals
 2003–04 GPF
2002–03 GPF
United States Nationals scores
2006 Nationals
2005 Nationals
2004 Nationals
2003 Nationals
2002 Nationals
2000 Nationals

! colspan="3" style="border-top: 5px solid #78FF78;" |World Records Holder

1984 births
Living people
American female single skaters
Olympic silver medalists for the United States in figure skating
Figure skaters at the 2002 Winter Olympics
Figure skaters at the 2006 Winter Olympics
Figure skating commentators
Jewish American sportspeople
American people of Ukrainian-Jewish descent
Olympic medalists in figure skating
World Figure Skating Championships medalists
Medalists at the 2006 Winter Olympics
Season-end world number one figure skaters
Aliso Niguel High School alumni
Sportspeople from Newport Beach, California
Figure skaters from Los Angeles
Columbia University School of General Studies alumni
Competitors at the 2001 Goodwill Games
21st-century American Jews
21st-century American women